The following is a list of composers who lived and composed classical music in the Northwest region of the United States and whose music has been performed in a traditional setting - a ballet, chamber ensemble, concert band, opera, orchestra, or solo.

A B C 
Miguel del Águila
William Bergsma
Ernest Bloch
William Bolcom
Roger Briggs
Timothy Brock
David Crumb

D E F G 
Stuart Dempster
Janice Giteck

H I J K 
Bern Herbolsheimer
Wayne Horvitz
Alan Hovhaness
Samuel Jones
Robert Kyr

L M N O P Q
Morten Lauridsen
Dylan Mattingly
Jovino Santos Neto
Michael Nicolella

R S T 
Carol Sams
Masguda Shamsutdinova 
Gregory Short
Allen Strange
Tomas Svoboda
Gloria Swisher
Diane Thome
Gerhard Trimpin

U V W X Y Z 
John Verrall

References

American

Composers
de:Liste US-amerikanischer Komponisten klassischer Musik